The Argiles d'lignite du Soissonnais is a geologic formation in the Oise department of northern France. The formation has provided fossil mammals, reptiles and fish as well as arthropods in the amber of the formation. The Argiles d'lignite du Soissonnais dates back to the Ypresian stage of the Eocene period.

Description 
The formation comprises a succession of lenticular bodies showing two main facies; clayey sands rich in frequently pyritised lignite, together with amber and grey clayey sands with less lignite (1 to 12 % of the sediment), with continental vertebrate fauna. These facies, the rarity of mollusk shells and charophytes, probably due to decarbonatation and the presence of pyrrhotite (FeS4), reflect a hypoxic environment.

The strata were deposited at the bottom of two channels cutting into underlying Thanetian marine green sands. The channels prograde toward the northeast and were discovered under Oise River Quaternary deposits.

Fossil content 
The formation has provided among others the following fossils:

Mammals 
Primates

 Teilhardina aff. belgica
 Cantius sp.
 Platychoerops sp.

Artiodactyls
 Diacodexis sp.

Cimolesta
 Esthonyx sp.
 cf. Apatotheria indet.

Eutheria
 Palaeosinopa sp.
 cf. Landenodon sp.

Ferae

 Dormaalocyon latouri
 Gracilocyon solei
 Oxyaena woutersi
 Palaeonictis gigantea
 Palaeanodon sp.
 Vassacyon taxidiotis

Hyaenodonta

 Arfia gingerichi
 Prototomus girardoti
 P. minimus

Macroscelidea
 cf. Macrocranion sp.

Multituberculata
 Multituberculata indet.

Perissodactyls
 Chowliia europea
 cf. Pachynolophus sp.

Placentalia
 Hyopsodus sp.

Rodents
 Pliolophus quesnoyensis
 Ischyromyidae indet.

Soricomorpha
 Leptacodon sp.
 Wyonycteris sp.

Theriiformes
 Peratherium sp.
 Pantodonta indet.

Reptiles 
Turtles

 Merovemys ploegi
 Paleotrionyx cf. vittatus
 Cryptodira indet.
 Trionychidae indet.

Crocodiles

 Allognathosuchus sp.
 Asiatosuchus sp.
 Diplocynodon sp.

Lizards

 Eolacerta sp.
 Placosaurus sp.
 Plesiolacerta sp.
 Gekkonidae indet.
 Lacertidae indet.
 ?Anguinae indet.
 ?Cordylidae indet.
 ?Iguanidae indet.
 ?Necrosaurus indet.

Snakes

 Dunnophis matronensis
 Saniwa cf. orsmaelensis
 Boidae indet.

Amphibians 

 Caudata indet.
 Pelobatidae indet.
 Salamandroidea indet.
 cf. Koaliella indet.

Fish 

 Anomotodon novus
 Isurolamna inflata
 Lepisosteus fimbriatus
 Otodus obliquus
 Pachygaleus lefevrei
 Palaeogaleus vincenti
 Palaeohypotodus rutoti
 Squalus orpiensis
 Striatolamia striata
 Cyclurus sp.
 Heterodontus sp.
 Myliobatis sp.
 Notorynchus sp.
 Squatina sp.
 Percoidei indet.

Arthropods 
Diptera
 Eurodoliopteryx inexpectatus
 Coleoptera, Hemiptera, Hymenoptera, Psocodea, Arachnida

Pancrustacea 
 Collembola indet.
 Hexapoda indet.

Flora 

 Nitellopsis sp.
 Pinophyta indet.
 Arecaceae indet.
 Myricaceae indet.
 Juglandaceae indet.
 Lauraceae indet.
 Apocynaceae indet.
 Caesalpiniaceae indet.
 Celastraceae indet.

See also 
 List of fossiliferous stratigraphic units in France
 Ypresian formations
 Ieper Group of Belgium
 Fur Formation of Denmark
 London Clay Formation of England
 Silveirinha Formation of Portugal
 Wasatchian formations
 Nanjemoy Formation of the eastern United States
 Wasatch Formation of the western United States
 Itaboraian formations
 Itaboraí Formation of Brazil
 Laguna del Hunco Formation of Argentina

References

Bibliography 

 
 
 
 
 

Geologic formations of France
Paleogene France
Eocene Series of Europe
Ypresian Stage
Sandstone formations
Coal formations
Amber
Fluvial deposits
Fossiliferous stratigraphic units of Europe
Paleontology in France
Formations